Government.no is the web portal for the Government of Norway. Operated by the Government Administration Services, it provides a range of information services related to each of the ministries, the Office of the Prime Minister, historical information and a large backlog of public documents.

The site was launched on 12 February 2007, replacing the former odin.dep.no site.

References

External links
 
  
  

Government of Norway
Government services portals
Norwegian websites
2007 establishments in Norway